Craspedocephalus strigatus, commonly known as the horseshoe pit viper, is a venomous pitviper endemic to the Western Ghats of India. No subspecies are currently recognized.

Geographic range
Endemic to the Western Ghats, in Karnataka , Tamil nadu and Kerala states of  South India, Trimeresurus strigatus is distributed in the montane forests and Shola grasslands of the Upper Nilgiri (Whitaker & Captain, 2004). Historically misidentified and misreported from extralimital localities from both the Western Ghats and the Eastern Ghats. Perhaps this is the species of pitviper confirmed from India to have the smallest geographic range of all.

The type locality listed is "Cape of Good Hope?" and "Madras?" (Madras Presidency (and not the City), India). The former must be a mistake. Boulenger (1896) restricted the type locality to "Madras Presidency". Inhabits to Sholagrasslands and montane forests. Terrestrial and probably diurnal. Feeds on frogs, lizards and mice. Natural history poorly-known.

Description
Craspedocephalus strigatus may be distinguished from other pit vipers of peninsular India based on the presence of small internasals, 2nd supralabial in contact with loreal pit, 21 rows of smooth or weakly-keeled dorsal scales at midbody, and a single row of scales between labials and suboculars. The common name of the species is based on the presence of a pale buff horseshoe-shaped (i.e., inverted 'U') mark on the nape. The snake is pale brownish or buff coloured with darker blotches of grey and some white streaks.

This species is essentially a terrestrial animal, with most of the sightings on ground or rock formations.

Of 12 snakes measured, the mean snout-vent length (SVL) was 24.4 ± 7.04 cm (9.6 ± 2.8 in), the tail length (tL) was 3.5 ± 0.8 cm (1.4 ± 0.3 in), and the weight was 172 ± 10.5 g (6 ± 0.4 oz).

References

Further reading

 Boulenger, G.A. 1896. Catalogue of the Snakes in the British Museum (Natural History). Vol. III., Containing the...Viperidæ. Trustees of the British Museum (Natural History). (Taylor & Francis, Printers.) xiv + 727 pp. + Plates I.- XXV. (Lachesis strigatus, pp. 549–550.)
 Gray, J.E. 1842. Synopsis of the species of Rattle-Snakes, or Family of CROTALIDÆ. The Zoological Miscellany 2: 47-51. ("Trimesurus [sic] strigatus", p. 49.)
 Herrmann, H.-W.; Ziegler, T.; Malhotra, A.; Thorpe, R.S.; & Parkinson, C.L. 2004. Redescription and systematics of Trimeresurus cornutus (Serpentes: Viperidae) based on morphology and molecular data. Herpetologica 60 (2): 211-221.

 Ganesh, S.R. & S. R. Chandramouli. 2018. On the distribution of Trimeresurus strigatus Gray, 1842 – a corrective note. Sauria 40 (1): 87-91.

External links
 

strigatus
Endemic fauna of India
Reptiles of India
Taxa named by John Edward Gray
Reptiles described in 1842